22 Gia Long Street, now 22 Lý Tự Trọng Street, is an apartment building in Ho Chi Minh City (also known as Saigon), the largest city in Vietnam. In 1975, photojournalist Hubert van Es, working for UPI, captured an iconic photo of U.S government employees evacuating the city by helicopter during the Fall of Saigon, the last major battle of the Vietnam War. The evacuation was code named Operation Frequent Wind. 

The image was widely misreported as showing Americans crowding on to the roof of the United States Embassy to board a helicopter. The photo depicts an Air America Huey helicopter landing on the roof of the elevator shaft to evacuate employees of the U.S. government as North Vietnamese People's Army of Vietnam troops entered Saigon.

The frequent misunderstanding of what the photograph shows stems from a change made to the photograph's caption at the Tokyo office of United Press International (UPI). Although the photographer van Es submitted the photo to UPI with an accurate caption, UPI's Tokyo office changed the caption so it falsely read: "A U.S. helicopter evacuating employees of the U.S. embassy." Although van Es repeatedly attempted to correct the error, his efforts were "futile" and he eventually "gave up." Thus, as van Es has explained, "[O]ne of the best known images of the Vietnam War shows something other than what almost everyone thinks it does."

At the end of the war, Saigon was renamed Ho Chi Minh City, and Gia Long Street (named for the emperor Gia Long, reigned 1802–1820) was renamed Lý Tự Trọng Street, in honor of a 17-year-old communist executed by the French. Visitors are allowed access to the roof by taking the elevator to the 9th floor.

As the 2021 Taliban offensive led to the Fall of Kabul, reporters drew comparisons between the evacuation at 22 Gia Long Street to images of helicopter evacuations from the U.S. embassy in Kabul. The BBC continued to misreport the photo as showing the US Embassy, later changed to the non-existent "CIA station".

References

External links
 

Installations of the Central Intelligence Agency
United States Agency for International Development
Apartment buildings
Residential buildings in Vietnam
Buildings and structures in Ho Chi Minh City
Saigon
History of South Vietnam
Tourism in Vietnam
Vietnam War sites